BR-104 is a federal highway of Brazil. The 672.3 kilometre road connects Macau to Maceió.

Campina Grande (PB) and Caruaru (PE) are famous for the biggest June festivities in Brazil. The region of Caruaru, Santa Cruz do Capibaribe and Toritama (all in Pernambuco) is home to the well-known "clothing pole". The production of these pieces is sold throughout Brazil and in South American countries, especially in Paraguay.

References 

Federal highways in Brazil